Paradise is a town located in the southern part of Cache County, Utah, United States. The population was 904 at the 2010 census. It is included in the Logan, Utah-Idaho Metropolitan Statistical Area.

Geography
According to the United States Census Bureau, the town has a total area of 1.1 square miles (2.9 km2), all land.

Demographics

As of the census of 2000, there were 759 people, 217 households, and 179 families residing in the town. The racial makeup of the town was 98.55% White, 0.13% Native American, 0.13% Asian, 0.66% Pacific Islander, 0.13% from other races, and 0.40% from two or more races. Hispanic or Latino of any race were 1.84% of the population.

There were 217 households, out of which 49.3% had children under the age of 18 living with them, 77.9% were married couples living together, 4.1% had a female householder with no husband present, and 17.5% were non-families. 16.6% of all households were made up of individuals, and 8.8% had someone living alone who was 65 years of age or older. The average household size was 3.50 and the average family size was 3.98.

In the town, the population was spread out, with 36.0% under the age of 18, 11.1% from 18 to 24, 25.8% from 25 to 44, 19.9% from 45 to 64, and 7.2% who were 65 years of age or older. The median age was 28 years. For every 100 females, there were 107.4 males. For every 100 females age 18 and over, there were 101.7 males.

The median income for a household in the town was $47,344, and the median income for a family was $54,375. Males had a median income of $34,821 versus $22,396 for females. The per capita income for the town was $14,679. About 3.6% of families and 6.1% of the population were below the poverty line, including 7.4% of those under age 18 and 7.2% of those age 65 or over.

Notable people 

 Lee Bickmore, businessman and CEO of Nabisco
 Casey Snider, member of the Utah House of Representatives

References

External links
 Town website

Towns in Cache County, Utah
Towns in Utah
Logan metropolitan area
Populated places established in 1860